The 2014 Auto Club 400 was a NASCAR Sprint Cup Series stock car race that was held on March 23, 2014, at Auto Club Speedway in Fontana, California. Contested over 206 laps on the  asphalt D-shaped oval  – extended from 200 laps due to a green–white–checker finish – it was the fifth race of the 2014 NASCAR Sprint Cup Series. Kyle Busch won the race, his first win of the season, while Kyle Larson finished as the highest rookie in second, while Kurt Busch, Matt Kenseth, and Tony Stewart rounded out the top five. Behind Larson, the top rookies in the race were Austin Dillon in 11th, and Cole Whitt in 18th.

Previous week's race
Just as the field was being lined up to restart the Food City 500, rain started to fall once again. After 503 laps, a two-hour delay to start the race, a three-hour delay at the quarter mark and multiple rain showers, NASCAR called the end of the race and Carl Edwards took the victory at Bristol Motor Speedway. Edwards described his race as "awesome", after troubles on the previous day, stating that his car was "terrible on Saturday, so I'm just glad we turned it around". Ricky Stenhouse Jr. scored his best career finish with a runner up spot, stating that he had "a lot of fun" and that his team was "just slowly working and getting better and better", as he continued to improve results in his first full season in the Sprint Cup. Aric Almirola also scored his best career finish, at the time of the race, in third place.

Report

Background

The track's turns are banked from fourteen degrees, while the front stretch, the location of the finish line, is banked at eleven degrees. Unlike the front stretch, the backstraightaway is banked at three degrees. The track has a seating capacity of 92,100 people. The defending race winner was Kyle Busch.

Entry list
The entry list for the Auto Club 400 was released on Tuesday, March 18 at 1:49 p.m. Eastern time. Forty-three cars were entered for the race which meant no one would fail to qualify.

Practice

First practice
Landon Cassill wrecked his primary car during the session and was forced to roll out the backup car. Because this change took place prior to qualifying, he did not have to start from the rear of the field.

Qualifying

Kenseth praised the performance of his Joe Gibbs Racing team and their qualifying setup, stating that "they gave me the car and really all I did was not mess it up". Joining Kenseth on the front row was Brad Keselowski, who noted a change in tire performance compared to qualifying sessions earlier in the season. He stated that Auto Club Speedway was "probably the first qualifying effort where the cars have gone slower in the last round with the tire fall off playing a factor in that. So, each week is different as far as what it is going to take to make it through all three rounds. I think that is part of the interest and the challenge for us as teams and drivers". He also noted a potential for unpredictability, stating that there was an "infinite amount of variables and teams that can dial that in the best are the ones that will be up front. So far we have been able to do that which I think is a strong statement for our team". Jeff Gordon, who qualified sixth, stated that the tires were unpredictable, adding that "you're having to keep the same set of tires on the car and guess which direction it is going to go".

Qualifying results

Practice (post-qualifying)

Second practice
Martin Truex Jr. hit the wall in turn 1 after his car cut down the left-rear tire, and this necessitated the rolling out of his backup car. Because this was a post-qualifying change, he was forced to start from the rear.

Final practice
Joey Logano hit the wall in turn 2 after cutting down the left-rear tire. Like Truex, he was forced to start at the rear. Logano put the issue down to a combination of air pressure and car setup.

Race

Driver change
The night before the race, Denny Hamlin went to the infield care center at Auto Club Speedway due to an irritation in his eye. The irritation continued overnight, and it was reported at the time that he had a sinus infection. After being referred to a local hospital, the cause of the irritation was discovered to be a small piece of metal in his eye. J. D. Gibbs, president of Joe Gibbs Racing announced that Hamlin would not start the race less than an hour before the start. Sam Hornish Jr., who was on standby for Matt Kenseth in the previous day's Nationwide Series race, drove the No. 11 car in his place.

First half

Start
The race started at 3:16 p.m. Eastern time with Kenseth leading the field to the green flag. He was passed by Brad Keselowski on the first lap. The first caution of the race flew on lap 19 after Kevin Harvick cut down his right-rear tire on the front stretch. Jeff Gordon exited pit road third, but was caught speeding and had to restart from the rear. David Ragan stayed out when Keselowski pitted to lead a lap before pitting. The race restarted on lap 24 with Keselowski leading the way, but Kyle Busch soon passed him for the lead. Keselowski retook the lead on lap 27, and held the lead until the second caution of the race flew on lap 43 after Dale Earnhardt Jr. cut down the left-front tire and scraped the wall in Turn 1. Jimmie Johnson exited pit road first and assumed the lead for the restart on lap 48.

The third caution of the race flew on lap 57 after Tony Stewart spun out exiting turn 2. Clint Bowyer stayed out when Johnson pitted, believing that the light at the entrance to pit road to be red. Gordon and Keselowski did likewise, but Bowyer and Gordon pitted the following lap. The race restarted on lap 61 and Johnson had no trouble passing Keselowski for the lead with four new tires. The fourth caution of the race flew on lap 70 after Brian Scott got into Aric Almirola and sent them both spinning into the infield grass just past the entrance of pit road. Almirola had to back off the throttle when his forward progress was interrupted by Hornish. Scott was moving to the top of the race track and was caught by surprise. Upon being released from the infield care center, Almirola frankly stated that Scott was "out there having fun because his daddy gets to pay for it". Ryan Newman stayed out and took the lead.

Second half

Halfway

The race restarted on lap 75 and just like the previous restart, Kenseth had no trouble passing Newman with four new tires. Johnson retook the lead on lap 84, just before the fifth caution of the race flew on lap 86 after Parker Kligerman got loose and backed into the Turn 3 wall. Johnson and Kenseth swapped the lead on pit road, and Kenseth exited the leader. The race restarted on lap 91 and Johnson did not take long to pass Kenseth for the lead. Gordon took the race lead for the first time on lap 106, holding the lead to the sixth caution of the race, which flew on lap 118 after Carl Edwards cut down his left-rear tire and spun out in turn 2. Kenseth won the race off pit road and assumed the lead for the restart on lap 123. Johnson took back the lead on lap 127. Harvick was running third when he had another cut tire, this time the left-rear, with 63 laps to go.

Tire blowouts
Debris in turn 3 brought out the seventh caution of the race with 60 laps to go; Johnson and Gordon swapped the lead on pit road, but Johnson exited first, and the led the field to the restart, with 52 laps to go. The eighth caution of the race flew with 34 laps to go after David Gilliland rear-ended the wall in turn 4. Just like the previous pit cycle, Johnson and Gordon swapped the lead on pit road, and Johnson once again led off pit road, for the restart with 27 laps to go. With seven laps to go, Johnson cut down his left-front tire and Gordon took the lead. A number of cars started cutting down their tires including points leader Keselowski (right-rear), Marcos Ambrose (left-rear) and Bowyer who cut down his right-front tire; Bowyer spun out and brought out the ninth caution of the race with three laps to go, to cause a green–white–checker finish. Landon Cassill stayed out when Gordon pitted to assume the lead.

Finish
The race required only one attempt for the green–white–checker finish. Cassill did not put up a fight and Kurt Busch moved to the front. On the final lap, Kyle Busch passed his brother and held off a hard charging Kyle Larson to win the race. Upon exiting his car, Kyle Busch stated that the finish was exciting, and that "what do you expect when you have a green-white-checkered finish and everyone comes down pit road to put on four tires", believing the finish to be like something out of the movie Days of Thunder. After winning his first Nationwide Series race the previous day, Larson stated that it had "been a really good weekend" and that he had been battling "probably a 12th place car for most of the day".

Race results

Race summary
 Lead changes: 35 among different drivers
 Cautions/Laps: 8 for 38
 Red flags: 0
 Time of race: 3 hours, 5 minutes and 53 seconds
 Average speed:

Media

Television

Radio

Standings after the race

Drivers' Championship standings

Manufacturers' Championship standings

 Note: Only the first sixteen positions are included for the driver standings.

Notes

References

Auto Club 400
Auto Club 400
Auto Club 400
NASCAR races at Auto Club Speedway